Orren Cheney Moore (August 10, 1839 – May 12, 1893) was a U.S. Representative from New Hampshire.

Born in New Hampton, New Hampshire, Moore attended the public schools, learned the trade of printer and became a journalist. He served as member of the New Hampshire House of Representatives in 1863, 1864, 1875, 1876, and 1878. He established the Nashua Daily Telegraph in 1869. He served as member of the State tax commission in 1878 and served in the New Hampshire Senate, 1879-1881. He was again a member of the State house of representatives in 1887, and he served as chairman of the state railroad commission, 1884-1888.

Moore was elected as a Republican to the Fifty-first Congress (March 4, 1889 – March 3, 1891). He was an unsuccessful candidate for reelection in 1890 to the Fifty-second Congress. He resumed his former pursuits as editor and publisher, and died in Nashua, on May 12, 1893. He was interred in the Woodlawn Cemetery.

References

1839 births
1893 deaths
American newspaper publishers (people)
19th-century American newspaper publishers (people)
Republican Party members of the New Hampshire House of Representatives
Republican Party New Hampshire state senators
Republican Party members of the United States House of Representatives from New Hampshire
19th-century American journalists
American male journalists
People from New Hampton, New Hampshire
19th-century American male writers
19th-century American politicians